Bill Carr (10 March 1901 – 27 January 1982) was a British equestrian. He competed in two events at the 1936 Summer Olympics.

References

External links
 

1901 births
1982 deaths
British male equestrians
Olympic equestrians of Great Britain
Equestrians at the 1936 Summer Olympics
Sportspeople from Kensington